The Great Northern P-1 was a class of 15 4-8-2 "Mountain" type steam locomotives built by the Lima Locomotive Works in 1914 and operated by the Great Northern Railway.

History
The P-1s were at first assigned to pull passenger trains, but were proven to be too slow and were reassigned to freight service. Between June and November 1928, they were all rebuilt by the GN's Superior, Great Falls, and Hillyard Shops to Q-2 Class 2-10-2s.

Disposition
Neither the P-1s nor the Q-2s have survived into preservation today. Retirement started on July 16, 1953 and were all retired by April 1958.

References

Great Northern Railway (U.S.)
4-8-2 locomotives
Lima locomotives
Railway locomotives introduced in 1914
P-1
Standard gauge locomotives of the United States
Steam locomotives of the United States
Scrapped locomotives